Guta may refer to:
  
Guta (spirit), a demon from Hungarian mythology
Guta Saga, a saga treating the history of Gotland before its Christianization
Guta language, a Kainji language of Nigeria, Naraguta in Hausa

Places
Guta District, in Jinzhou, Liaoning, China
Kolárovo, formerly named Guta, town in the south of Slovakia
Guta raJehovah, or just Guta, a church in Zvimba, Zimbabwe,

People
Guta Stresser (born 1972), Brazilian television actress
Nicolae Guţă (born 1967), Gypsy manele and jazz singer
Gheorghe Tătărescu (1886–1957), Romanian prime minister, known as Guţă Tătărescu
Judith of Habsburg (German: Guta von Habsburg) (1271–1297), queen of Bohemia and Poland
Edwin Sablon (born 1981), American singer/songwriter and guitar player with Guta. Gutamusic

See also 
 Huta